

Nilpena Ediacara National Park, comprising the former Ediacara Conservation Park and an additional , is a protected area located in the Australian state of South Australia about  south west of the town of Leigh Creek in the state's Far North, around  north of the city of Adelaide. The national park was proclaimed in June 2021.

History

Conservation park
The Ediacara Conservation Park was proclaimed under the National Parks and Wildlife Act 1972 on 26 April 2007 over land previously declared as a conservation reserve under the Crown Lands Act 1929 in 1993 and as a fossil reserve in 1958.

National park
On 28 March 2019, the Government of South Australia purchased  of adjacent land, to enlarge the conservation park by ten times. The land, formerly owned by the Nilpena Pastoral Company, extends as far as Lake Torrens National Park. The entire area was reclassified and proclaimed as Nilpena Ediacara National Park on 17 June 2021. A visitor hub and Ediacara Fossil experience were developed in 2021, expected to commence in 2022.

Description

There is a theory that Ediacara is derived from the Adnyamathanha language name "Ithiaka-na-danha, where Ithi means zebra finch and aka – na-danha means "to come out", which is used as the name for the area in which the conservation park was located.; but see Ediacara Hills#Word origin.

The conservation park was created to protect and conserve an "assemblage of fossilised Ediacaran soft-bodied marine organisms of international importance," "places of significance" to the Adnyamathanha people, "remnants of mining history associated with the Ediacara mineral field," and an "important chenopod habitat." It was classified as an IUCN Category VI protected area. The fossil reserve is also listed on the South Australian Heritage Register.

See also
 Protected areas of South Australia
 List of fossil parks
 Australian National Heritage List

References

External links

Ediacara Conservation Park on Protected Planet

Protected areas established in 1993
1993 establishments in Australia
Fossil parks in Australia
Far North (South Australia)
Flinders Ranges
National parks of South Australia